Dierssen Wildlife Management Area is a Wildlife Management Area (WMA) near Seneca in Montgomery County, Maryland. 

The WMA covers a  tract of marshy woodland, with two man-made ponds ('impoundments') for wildlife, located between Chesapeake & Ohio Canal towpath (mileposts 20.08 to 20.90) and the Potomac River.  The nearest access point is the Pennyfield Lock parking lot at MP 19.7.

Unlike most WMAs in Maryland, Dierrsen is a wildlife sanctuary - no hunting is allowed, but hiking and photography are encouraged.   Because of the impoundments and location on the Potomac migration route, the tract is a well-known habitat for waterfowl, wading birds and songbirds.  There are nesting boxes for wood ducks. Also present are white-tailed deer, gray and red fox, beaver, and wild turkeys.  The site, donated as a waterfowl sanctuary, is named for Marshall Bidwell Dierssen.

References

External links
 Dierssen Wildlife Management Area

Wildlife management areas of Maryland
Protected areas of Montgomery County, Maryland
Chesapeake and Ohio Canal